https://www.wesleasy.com

Wesley Leasy (born September 7, 1971) is a former American football linebacker. He played for the Arizona Cardinals from 1995 to 1996.

References

1971 births
Living people
American football linebackers
Mississippi State Bulldogs football players
Arizona Cardinals players